The 2nd Battalion, Royal Australian Regiment (2 RAR) is an amphibious light infantry battalion of the Australian Army part of the 1st Division Amphibious Task Group based at Lavarack Barracks in Townsville.

2 RAR was initially formed as the Australian 66th Battalion in 1945 as part of the 34th Brigade (Australia) and since then it has seen active service during the Korean War, Malayan Emergency and Vietnam War. In addition, the battalion has participated in peacekeeping operations in Japan, Rwanda, East Timor and the Solomon Islands and has contributed rifle companies to the security force protecting the Australian embassy in Baghdad following the 2003 invasion of Iraq. In May 2006, 2 RAR's headquarters, support company and a rifle company deployed to Iraq as part of the third rotation of the Al Muthanna Task Group. In June 2011, the battalion deployed to Urozgan Province, Afghanistan as Mentoring Task Force Three (MTF3). In 2011, 2 RAR was selected to be the Army's Amphibious Ready Element Landing Force embarked on the Navy's new Canberra-class amphibious assault ships. The conversion process was completed in October 2017.

History

Formation
2 RAR was formed originally as the 66th Battalion at the end of World War II on 16 October 1945 as a regular infantry force raised from volunteers from the 9th Division for service with the British Commonwealth Occupation Force in Japan. The battalion was stationed primarily at Hiro as part of the 34th Brigade from February 1946 to December 1948, when they returned to Australia. A month earlier, on 23 November 1948 it was renamed the 2nd Battalion, Australian Regiment, with the Royal regimental prefix being granted on 31 March 1949.

Upon 2 RAR's return to Australia they became part of the 1st Independent Brigade Group at Puckapunyal, Victoria, where they would remain until March 1953 as a training unit for recruits for the two battalions fighting in Korea.

Korean War
2 RAR's involvement in the Korean War was limited by the fact that it was not committed until late in the fighting.  Instead, as mentioned above, the unit was used as a training unit that provided reinforcements for the other two RAR battalions that had been sent to Korea. The unit embarked for Korea on 5 March 1953 on board the MV New Australia, arriving on 17 March 1953. A few days later detachments from all three RAR battalions paraded at Camp Casey near Tongduchon, South Korea, the first time that the Royal Australian Regiment had paraded as a whole.

In April, 2 RAR relieved 1 RAR and became part of the 28th British Commonwealth Brigade, attached to the 1st Commonwealth Division. At this stage of the war, a static phase had developed. Relieving a French battalion, 2 RAR took up a position along the Jamestown Line and began patrolling in the 'no-man's land' area around the Imjin and Samichon Rivers.

On 9 July 1953 the battalion relieved the 1st Battalion, The King's Regiment around a feature known as 'The Hook' on the left flank of the 1st Commonwealth Division. As peace talks were currently under way, offensive operations were not undertaken by the Australians in this time, although 2 RAR continued to conduct patrolling operations, as well as the myriad of other tasks associated with defence such as maintaining minefields, digging trenches, capturing prisoners and collecting intelligence.

A few weeks later, on the night of 24 July 1953, the Chinese attacked the UN positions on The Hook in an effort to gain more ground prior to the signing of the armistice agreement. Over the course of two nights, waves of Chinese soldiers attacked the Australian and American positions in frontal assaults aimed at overwhelming the defenders through sheer weight of numbers. In between attacks, artillery and mortar attacks were launched during the day to soften up the defences. In an effort to hold the line reinforcements from 'D' Company, 3 RAR and the 1st Battalion, Durham Light Infantry were brought up and placed under 2 RAR command before the attacks were finally beaten off on the morning of 26 July. The number of Chinese dead was estimated between 2,000 and 3,000, while 2 RAR's casualties for the two nights were five killed and another twenty-four wounded.

There were no further attacks and the armistice came into effect the following day. Despite the end of hostilities, 2 RAR remained in Korea as part of the UN forces stationed in the country until 6 April 1954, when it returned to Australia, once again on the MV New Australia. Total losses for 2 RAR while it had been in Korea had been 22 killed.

Malayan Emergency
In the late 1950s and early 1960s, 2 RAR undertook two tours of Malaya during the Malayan Emergency, the first between October 1955 and October 1957 and the second between October 1961 and August 1963. The battalion arrived in Malaya for its first tour on 19 October 1955 and was once again attached to the 28th Commonwealth Infantry Brigade Group as part of the British Commonwealth Far East Strategic Reserve (FESR) along with British and New Zealand troops. Throughout the two-year tour the battalion was based at Minden Barracks on Penang Island, although it spent large periods of time in the jungle conducting operations and exercises that frequently lasted weeks at a time.

Due to a delay in obtaining Australian government approval to conduct operations against the Malayan Communist Party (MCP), and their armed wing the Malayan National Liberation Army, 2 RAR did not commence operations until 1 January 1956 when the battalion was involved in Operation Deuce, which was a search and security operation in Kedah that was to last until the end of April when 2 RAR was relieved by the 1st Battalion, Royal Malay Regiment. For the next twenty months the battalion would continue to conduct similar operations – known as Operations Shark North and Rubberlegs – mainly in Perak, which was considered to be one of the main areas of Communist activity. These operations were primarily long-distance patrols in and around jungle areas searching for the Communists and providing perimeter security for the 'New Villages'.

During this time contacts were very limited, and the most intense action came on 22 June 1956 when a five-man patrol from 2 RAR was ambushed by a group of Communists near the Sungei Bemben reservoir. Three Australians were killed in this incident and three others were wounded and as other Australian patrols converged on the area a firefight ensued in which two of the attackers were killed before the others broke contact and dispersed.

Throughout 1956 operations continued and 2 RAR's companies took turns rotating through Kroh in the north of Perak on the Thai-Malay border.  Between May and June 1957, 2 RAR took part in Operation Eagle Swoop, during which, on the afternoon of 24 June, they discovered a large Communist camp and in the subsequent clash two Australians were killed and one was wounded. Further operations were undertaken, including further patrols and ambushes, until finally in August 1957 2 RAR was withdrawn from anti-Communist operations and returned to its primary deterrence role as part of the FESR. This did not last long, however, as the battalion returned to Australia shortly afterwards in October 1957, to a large welcome home parade in Sydney.

The battalion's second tour of Malaya came four years later when it joined the 28th Brigade again, this time at Camp Terendak near Malacca in October 1961. While they had been in Australia, they had been converted to a Pentropic battalion, however, prior to their deployment they had been converted back to the tropical establishment. In August 1962 they were committed to anti-Communist operations in Perlis and Kedah once more, searching for the remnants of the MNLA Communist guerrillas along the Thai-Malay border. This lasted only a couple of months before it was decided to withdraw the battalion from this role for six months' training as part of the FESR. Regardless, several 2 RAR companies were used on further operations against the Communists in May 1963, before the battalion returned to Australia in August, without having suffered any losses. 2 RAR's total losses for the Malayan Emergency were 14 killed.

Vietnam

Two tours of South Vietnam were completed by 2 RAR during the Vietnam War. The first tour was between May 1967 and June 1968 with the second between May 1970 to May 1971. An advanced party from 2 RAR arrived in South Vietnam for their first tour in April 1967, although the main force did not deploy until the following month, embarking upon  which had been converted to a troop carrier. Stationed at Nui Dat in Phuoc Tuy Province as part of the 1st Australian Task Force (1 ATF), they took over from the 6th Battalion, Royal Australian Regiment.

Many of the battalion's members had recently served an eighteen month period overseas in Malaysia and Borneo. This restriction would mean that many personnel would only be able to serve a six-month tour and, as such, 2 RAR was brought up to full strength by accepting a draft of national servicemen from Australia. They were joined by Victor Company from the 1st Battalion, Royal New Zealand Infantry Regiment which had served with 6RAR at the end of that battalion's tour. A replacement Victor Company and a second New Zealand company, Whisky Company, arrived in December 1967 and were also placed under 2 RAR's command. In March 1968 the three Australian and two New Zealand companies were officially integrated and the battalion was given the formal title of 2 RAR/NZ (ANZAC). This was the first official integration of Australian and New Zealand infantry at unit or battalion level.

During 2 RAR's thirteen-month tour they undertook a total of 23 operations with the New Zealanders in Phuoc Tuy and Bien Hoa Provinces. This constant schedule of patrols and ambushes within its area of operations kept the Vietcong (VC) off balance. Many of these operations were conducted as an independent unit, while others were conducted with the support of other 1 ATF units. The most significant of these operations was Operation Coburg, which was mounted between 24 January and 1 March 1968 in the border area between Phuoc Tuy and Long Khanh Provinces. This operation was the first operation conducted by 1 ATF outside of Phuoc Tuy and was aimed at denying the VC the ability to attack the large American bases at Long Binh and Bien Hoa.  While this operation was underway, the Tet Offensive was launched, the result of which was that as well as contacting local force VC units, 2 RAR also came up against the main force units as well. 91 VC or North Vietnamese People's Army of Vietnam (PAVN) soldiers were killed in this operation.

2 RAR's involvement in Coburg ended on 14 February, although W Company, 1 RNZIR, remained with 3 RAR until the end of the operation in March. Operations in Phuoc Tuy continued until 25 April 1968 when the Battalion was deployed to the Bien Hoa–Long Khanh border to undertake Operation Toan Thang. This was to be 2 RAR's last major operation of its first tour and in June 1968 they were relieved by 4 RAR and returned to Australia, arriving there on 13 June. The two New Zealand infantry companies thereafter integrated with 4RAR.

2 RAR's second tour came almost two years later, when it returned to South Vietnam in May 1970, relieving 6 RAR at Nui Dat. Consisting of three rifle companies and a support company, 2 RAR was once again joined by two companies from the RNZIR and on 15 May the ANZAC title was adopted again. The second tour was focused mainly upon 'pacification', which sought to provide security of the struggling South Vietnamese state by seeking out and destroying the VC in their bases areas and isolating them from the ordinary civilian population. This was monotonous work for the infantrymen. The VC had been greatly weakened by the failure of the Tet Offensive, and as a result over the twelve months that 2 RAR was deployed contact was significantly less than had been experienced during the first tour, sustaining half the number of casualties. Nevertheless, the presence of two strong provincial VC regiments in the area meant that security in Phuoc Tuy remained problematic until the end and in May 1971, 4 RAR/NZ took over from 2 RAR and the battalion returned to Australia.

Total 2 RAR casualties for both tours were 32 killed and 182 wounded. New Zealand casualties over both tours were 10 killed and 57 wounded. Balanced against this, the battalion was credited with having killed 297 VC and captured a further 23.

As part of the post-Vietnam War reduction of the Australian Army 2 RAR was combined with 4 RAR between 15 August 1973 and 1 February 1995 as the 2nd/4th Battalion, Royal Australian Regiment.

Rwanda
Between August 1994 and August 1995 two contingents of Australian soldiers were deployed to Rwanda as part of the United Nations Assistance Mission in Rwanda (UNAMIR). The deployment was focused upon providing humanitarian assistance and medical care for sick and injured civilians and as such a combat role was not envisaged, however, a rifle company was sent also in order to protect the medical team and command elements. The first contingent drew security personnel from 'A' Company, 2/4 RAR and was deployed between August 1994 and February 1995. Following this, a second contingent was sent, this time drawn from 'B' Company, 2 RAR, having been delinked only days before. During this deployment, the company was responsible for providing security at Kigali airport and for providing escorts to the medical team.

In April 1995, there was a serious outbreak of violence in one of the refugee camps that 2 RAR personnel were based at. Outnumbered and unable to undertake offensive operations due to the restrictions placed upon their operations by the UN Mandate governing the deployment, the Australians were unable to intervene. It has since been estimated that up to 4,000 refugees were killed by members of the Rwandan Patriotic Army in this incident, although this number may well have been higher if not for the efforts of the Australian medics and infantrymen who braved hostile fire on numerous occasions without the ability to return fire as they attempted to assist the wounded and dying.

The second contingent remained in Rwanda until August 1995 when it was withdrawn from the war torn country and the Australian commitment ended.

East Timor
In September 1999, Australia deployed a brigade-sized combat element to East Timor as part of the UN sanctioned International Force – East Timor (INTERFET) that was deployed in order to restore law and order and end the widespread violence and destruction that had broken out following a referendum in August that had shown overwhelming support for independence from Indonesia. As a part of this deployment, the Australian force was charged with restoring peace and security and facilitating the provision of humanitarian assistance.  2 RAR was one of the first units deployed once the airfield at Dili had been secured by elements of the Special Air Service Regiment. Arriving in Dili on 20 September 1999 having been flown in from Townsville, they immediately started the process of restoring order to the capital so that it could be used as an operational base from which further operations could be launched in the surrounding countryside.

As the rest of 2 RAR began to dig in around Komoro Airport to secure the air link with Australia and launched a number of patrols throughout the western part of the Dili, 'C' Company was detached to secure the beachhead at the docks. With two M-113 APCs from 3/4 Cav to provide fire support, 'C' Company began moving towards the docks, but found the way blocked as they encountered a number of platoon-strength roadblocks that had been set up by the Indonesian military TNI. Overcoming these obstacles by swarming over them in massed company formations, 'C' Company eventually reached the dock where they encountered large numbers of refugees as well as groups of Indonesian military and militia. A tense stand-off followed as the Australians set about the task of securing the port in preparation for the arrival of the follow-on seaborne forces that were to land the following day.

The following day, as reinforcements arrived at the dock by sea, 2 RAR was relieved by 3 RAR (Para), whose Admin Company took over the task of guarding the docks, freeing up 2 RAR to continue further operations around Dili.  Initial operations focused upon carrying out building searches, setting up roadblocks and vehicle checkpoints, gathering intelligence from locals and finding and disarming the local militias that had largely been responsible for the violence.

On 27 September, 'D' Company, 2 RAR, conducted an airmobile operation into Liquica, west of Dili, before the battalion returned to the capital to continue the task of making the city safe.  By the beginning of October Dili had been fairly well secured and so INTERFET began to move out into areas along the western border with Indonesian West Timor. 2 RAR's rifle companies were deployed to Balibo by helicopter on 1 October, while the rest of the battalion arrived the next day. Working closely with other units in the area from New Zealand and Britain, the northern border area was secured before pushing further inland to Maliana, Bobonaro and Suai, which were considered important towns in the western area of the country.

The key town of Suai was cleared on 6 October when 2 RAR operating alongside elements from the SASR and the Gurkhas, was airlifted into the town. In doing so, 116 pro-Indonesian militiamen were captured, later sparking further violence when other militia units began attacking the Australians, resulting in two 2 RAR soldiers being wounded.

Up until this time despite several cases of tense stand-offs earlier in the operation, for the most part the TNI had largely kept its distance from the Australian force as they carried out their evacuation back to Indonesia, however, on 10 October a clash occurred near the border at Mota'ain. As an Australian patrol from 'C' Company advanced towards the border Indonesian military, police, and militia forces opened fire upon the lead platoon and the Australians returned fire, resulting in a number of Indonesian casualties.  For his leadership under fire, Corporal Paul Teong, commander of the lead section in the forward platoon during the contact, was awarded the Distinguished Service Medal.

Amidst growing concern of further obstruction by the TNI, 2 RAR continued to conduct operations in the western border areas as slowly but surely security was restored to East Timor. On 3 January 2000, 2 RAR was relieved by 5/7 RAR (MECH). The following month INTERFET began transferring responsibility to the United Nations Transitional Administration in East Timor (UNTAET).

In October 2001, 2 RAR returned to East Timor, known as AUSBATT V of UNTAET, taking over from 4 RAR and serving a relatively uneventful tour, handing over to 3 RAR(Para) in April 2002.

In May 2006, Timor Leste (as East Timor has since become) asked for Australian assistance once more. As social, political and ethnic differences threatened to divide the country amidst a resurgence of violence, a new UN mission, United Nations Integrated Mission in East Timor (UNMIT) was established. As a part of Australia's continued commitment to the fledgling nation, a battle group, known as Battle Group Samichon, based upon 2 RAR deployed to Timor Leste between September 2007 to April 2008. The Battalion deployed for a further tour in May 2009. Known as Timor Leste Battle Group-VI this ANZAC Battle Group conducted security and stability operations as well as training for deployment to Afghanistan the following year.

Solomon Islands
In July 2003, amidst an outbreak of lawlessness, violence and civil unrest in the Solomon Islands, 2 RAR was deployed as part of a Combined Joint Task Force following a request for assistance from the Solomon Islands government.  Under the auspices of the United Nations Regional Assistance Mission to Solomon Islands (RAMSI), a two hundred strong reinforced company group based on 2 RAR was deployed to help support civilian police re-establish law and order as part of Operation Anode.

Iraq
Since the invasion of Iraq in 2003, 2 RAR has provided companies to the security force protecting the Australian embassy in Baghdad – SECDET. The first deployment came in May with 2003 when 5 Platoon, 'B' Company deployed on SECDET 1 with elements of 2nd Cavalry Regiment. A Coy deployed on the next rotation, SECDET II over the period Sep 03 - Jan 04 before handing over to A Coy, 3 RAR . In May 2006, 2 RAR's headquarters, support company and a rifle company deployed to Iraq as part of the third rotation of the Al Muthanna Task Group. The Battalion conducted a final SECDET in 2009-2010 when B Coy deployed as SECDET XV.

Afghanistan
From September 2007 to May 2008, elements of the battalion deployed to Afghanistan on Operation Slipper as part of RTF-3. The Security Task Group (STG) was made up of infantrymen from C Company 2 RAR, mortarmen and snipers from Support Company 2 RAR, IMV crews from 6 RAR and B Squadron, 3/4 Cavalry Regiment, cavalrymen from 2/14 LHR(QMI) and gunners from 4th Field Regiment. Elements from these units combined with elements of the 3rd Combat Engineer Regiment to form a combat team. The role of the STG was to provide the firepower and mobility necessary to facilitate the engineers' protected reconstruction. Intimately supported by Combat Engineers, Construction Engineers and Explosive Ordnance Disposal Technicians to make up Combat Team (CT) Spear, the STG was the fundamental enabler for the protected reconstruction effort.

The Combat Team conducted five major operations during its deployment, effectively expanding the ISAF and ANSF's permanent influence in the Chora Valley and into the Baluchi Pass. The Combat Team sustained casualties early in the deployment with Trooper David 'Poppy' Pearce being killed by an IED in the Dorufshan and Sergeant Michael Lyddiard being seriously wounded whilst defusing an IED in the Chora Valley. The Combat Team was able to take the fight to the enemy during several engagements, most notably in the Sorkh Morghab region where all elements of the Combat Team engaged the enemy over several days allowing the construction of a patrol base and the Afghan Army to move into an area previously considered a Taliban stronghold.

In June 2011, the Battalion deployed to Urozgan Province, Afghanistan as the Battle Group Headquarters and Combat Teams of Mentoring Task Force Three (MTF-3). This included the Battle of Doan as well as many other engagements with the Taliban. The Battalion returned to Australia in February 2012. MTF–3 handed over responsibility for the mission to the soldiers from the Brisbane-based 8/9 RAR who made up MTF–4 on 24 January 2012. Two members of the Battalion were killed during this rotation.

Restructure under Plan Beersheba

Under a restructuring program known as Plan Beersheba announced in late 2011, 2 RAR has formed the core of the Army's amphibious force. This has seen 108th Battery relocate from 4th Regiment, Royal Australian Artillery to 2 RAR as a sub-unit, being the only full-time infantry battalion with its own organic artillery battery.

On 15 October 2017, 2 RAR transferred from the 3rd Brigade to report directly to the headquarters of the 1st Division. The battalion remains based at Lavarack Barracks in Townsville, and become the division's specialist amphibious infantry battalion. The battalion's primary role is to provide specialist capabilities to conduct pre-landing activities for other elements of the Army. It includes small boat operators and reconnaissance and sniper teams as well as command, communications and logistics elements. 2 RAR has a strength of around 350 personnel, which is smaller than the RAR's infantry battalions.

A 2017 article in the Australian Infantry Magazine stated that in its specialist role, 2 RAR "will be responsible for amphibious reconnaissance and surveillance, small boat operations, battle space shaping and limited scale raiding in support of a Joint Amphibious Task Force". The battalion's main function will be to collect information for the commander of the ADF's Amphibious Task Group and other decision-makers. It is to be responsible for reconnoitring and seizing beaches, helicopter landing zones and airfields for the Australian Amphibious Force's main ground combat element. Following the completion of amphibious operations, the battalion will either re-embark or remain ashore as a reconnaissance unit. In the latter role, it is to be capable of conducting reconnaissance patrols well behind enemy lines and providing information to other units.

As part of this change, 2 RAR transitioned to a new structure in January 2018 which comprises a battalion headquarters, a security company with four infantry platoons, a support company and an administration company. The battalion is planned to generally deploy as the main element of the Australian Amphibious Force's Joint Pre-Landing Force (JPLF). It is planned that the 2 RAR elements generally assigned to the Pre-Landing Force (PLF) will be a command and control node, elements from the Reconnaissance and Sniper and Small Boat Platoons, two infantry platoons, a joint fires team and a signals detachment. The JPLF will also comprise Army geospatial and survey teams, electronic warfare teams, amphibious beach teams, Royal Australian Navy clearance divers and other specialist elements. Other elements of the Army, including an infantry battalion, form the Amphibious Ready Group's Ground Combat Element (GCE), and rotate through this role on an annual basis.

Current composition

As of 2014, 2 RAR consisted of:

 Battalion Headquarters
 2 Rifle Companies – 'A' & 'B'
 Support Company
 Small Boat Platoon
 Administration Company
 108th Battery (Observation Post) – 4th Regiment, Royal Australian Artillery

Since January 2018, 2 RAR has comprised:
Battalion headquarters
'A' Company
Four infantry platoons
Intelligence, Surveillance, and Reconnaissance Company
Reconnaissance and Sniper Platoon
Small Boat Platoon
Signals Platoon
Joint Fires Team
Administration Company

Battle and Theatre Honours
 Korea: Korea 1950–53, Samichon.
 Vietnam: Vietnam, Bien-Hoa, Coral–Balmoral.
 East Timor: East Timor 1999-2003
 Iraq: Iraq 2003-11

Commanding officers
The following table provides details of 2 RAR's Commanding Officers:

Alliances
 United Kingdom – Coldstream Guards

See also
 Royal Australian Regiment
 Military history of Australia during the Korean War
 Military history of Australia during the Vietnam War

Notes

References

 Coulthard-Clark, Chris. (1998). Where Australians Fought: The Encyclopaedia of Australia's Battles. Allen & Unwin: Sydney. .
 Dennis, Peter, Grey, Jeffrey, Morris, Ewan & Prior, Robin. (eds.) (1995). The Oxford Companion to Australian Military History. Oxford University Press: Melbourne. .
 
 Grey, Jeffrey. (2008). A Military History of Australia. 3rd Edition. Cambridge University Press: Melbourne. .
 Horner, David & Bou, Jean. (2008). Duty First. A History of the Royal Australian Regiment. Sydney: Allen & Unwin. .

 Morgan, Benjamin. (2006). A Brief History of Australian Army Operations in East Timor, 1999–2005 (Archived 2009-10-23). Academic research paper. Retrieved 20 March 2009.

Further reading

External links

 2RAR MTF Official Site
 A Short History of 2RAR
 The Collecting Bug: The 2 RAR Historical Collection Preserving, displaying and researching artefacts and memories from 2 RAR

Infantry units and formations of Australia
Military units and formations established in 1945
Military units and formations of Australia in the Korean War
Military units and formations of Australia in the Vietnam War
Military units and formations disestablished in 1973
Military units and formations established in 1995
Military units involved in UN peacekeeping missions
Military units in Queensland